Raden Aria Wangsakara ( 1615 –  1720) was a seventeenth century Sultan from Java, Muslim cleric and warrior who is generally credited with being the founder of Tangerang, a city in Indonesia which is now within the Jakarta metropolitan area. In November 2021 he was declared a National Hero of Indonesia by president Joko Widodo.

Biography

The exact biography of Aria Wangsakara is difficult about which to be certain because of contradictory accounts that appear in different texts, and a lack of direct evidence. In them he is said to have been born around 1615 in Sumedang, and to have been the son of Wiraraja I and a descendant of Sultan Syarif Abdulrohman of Sumedang Larang. The traditional narrative about him is that, as the  Dutch East India Company grew in influence in the region, Aria Wangsakara objected to his family's collaboration with them and left with two relatives in 1632 (Aria Santika and Aria Yuda Negara) to go to the region that is now Tangerang (on the banks of the Cisadane River), where he was granted a license to protect this area by Sultan Maulana Yusuf of the Banten. There he founded a new settlement (the Lengkong Sumedang Sultanate) on the west bank of the Cisadane River with himself as sultan under the name of Sultan Lengkong. While he ruled there he is said to have worked to spread Islam in the surrounding region, founding a new pesantren in the 1640s. In the early 1650s the Dutch East India Company built a fort on the opposite bank from his settlement to establish a presence in the region.

Wangsakara is thought to have died in 1720.

Legacy
Due to his status as the legendary founder of Tangerang, a major street in the city is named after him,. His tomb, which is also surrounded by the tombs of other clerics from the region, was also turned into an official historical site by the Tangerang Regency and has long been visited regularly by pilgrims. Many residents of Banten also claim descent from him, including a number of Ulama who claim descent from him and his original group of followers.
In November 2021, along with Tombolotutu, Aji Muhammad Idris, and Usmar Ismail, he was declared a National Hero of Indonesia by Indonesian president Joko Widodo.

References 

1615 births
1720s deaths
People from Sumedang
National Heroes of Indonesia
Year of birth uncertain
Year of death uncertain